Pristimantis apiculatus is a species of frog in the family Strabomantidae.
It is found in Colombia and Ecuador.
Its natural habitat is tropical moist montane forests.
It is threatened by habitat loss.

References

apiculatus
Amphibians of Colombia
Amphibians of Ecuador
Amphibians described in 1990
Taxonomy articles created by Polbot